Rafael Guillén (born in Granada, 27 April 1933) is a Spanish poet, a prominent member of the Generation of '50. 
"National Prize for Literature" in Spain (1994) and one of the most important authors of his generation, he has a long artistic career and among his merits is the fact of helping the recovery of Andalusian poetic culture after the devastation of the Spanish Civil War (1936-1939) The neoclassical influence that weighed on other members of his generation is noticeable in his early works. However, the attraction to popular themes and airs (Cancionero-guía para andar por el aire de Granada, 1962) soon took on an evolution that manifested itself, already in the sixties, abandoning the rigidity of traditional metrics. With the publication of Moheda (1979), it surprises with its uninhibited and innovative style in syntax. His themes are not light: love and eroticism are often mixed with elegy for the inevitable degradation of the passage of time, expressed in verses permeated with a cadenced musical phrasing.   

His prose work is divided between travel narratives, autobiography, essays, lectures and articles.

Selected bibliography
 Antes de la esperanza (1956)
 Río de Dios (Granada, 1957)
 Cancionero-guía para andar por el aire de Granada (Granada, 1962, 1970 and 1993)
 Moheda (Málaga, 1979)
 Poesía completa (1988)
 Los estados transparentes (1993 and 1998)
 La configuración de lo perdido (1995)
 I'm Speaking, selected poems. Northwestern University Press (Evanston, USA, 2001). English translation by Sandy McKinney. 
 Estado de palabra (2003)
 Signos en el polvo (2005)
 Obras completas (Granada, 2010) 
 Balada en tres tiempos (para contrabajo y frases cotidianas). Printed music by Xavier Astor. Diputación de Granada (Granada, 2013). 
 El otro lado de la niebla, Editorial Salto de Página (Madrid, 2013). 
 El centro del silencio. Selección de poemas (1956–2013). Entorno Gráfico Ediciones (Granada, 2014). 
 Balada en tres tiempos (para saxofón y frases coloquiales), Visor Libros (Madrid, 2014). 
  The Alhambra. A Suite of Silences and of the Senses. Photographs by Ángel Sánchez. English translation by Lawrence Bohme. Ediciones Miguel Sánchez (Granada, 2016). 
    Últimos poemas (Lo que nunca sabré decirte), Fundación José Manuel Lara (Sevilla, 2019).

Discography 
 Los alrededores del tiempo (Granada, 2001). Anthology of poems written up to the year 2000.
 Balada en tres tiempos para contrabajo y frases cotidianas (Barcelona, 2021). Nine pieces for poems and double bass by Rafael Guillén & Xavier Astor. Based on the book of the same name by both autors published in 2013. Fundación Omnia, DLB 9248-2021.

Notes

External links
 Rafael Guillén's website

Spanish poets
1933 births
Living people
Spanish male poets